Mianeh (also Romanized as Mīāneh, Meyāneh, and Mīyāneh; also known as Mīyāheh) is a village in Sar Firuzabad Rural District, Firuzabad District, Kermanshah County, Kermanshah Province, Iran. At the 2006 census, its population was 105, in 22 families.

References 

Populated places in Kermanshah County